Karate at the 2021 Islamic Solidarity Games was held in Konya, Turkey from 17 to 18 August 2022.

Medalists

Men

Women

Medal table

Participating nations
226 athletes from 30 countries participated:

References

External links
Official website
Results book

2021 Islamic Solidarity Games
Islamic Solidarity Games
2021
Islamic Solidarity Games
International karate competitions hosted by Turkey